Orthodox temple  may refer to:

Orthodox Church temple, the church building used by Eastern Orthodox Christianity
The ancient Jewish Temple in Jerusalem

See also
Temple (disambiguation)